is a railway station on the Taita Line in the city of Tajimi, Gifu Prefecture, Japan, operated by Central Japan Railway Company (JR Tokai).

Lines

Station layout
Koizumi Station has two opposed side platforms connected to the station building by a footbridge. The station has a Midori no Madoguchi staffed ticket office.

Platforms

Adjacent stations

|-
!colspan=5|JR Central

History
Koizumi Station opened on December 28, 1918. It was relocated to its present location on October 1, 1928. The station was absorbed into the JR Tokai network upon the privatization of the Japanese National Railways (JNR) on April 1, 1987.

Passenger statistics
In fiscal 2016, the station was used by an average of 1,294 passengers daily (boarding passengers only).

Surrounding area

 Chūō Expressway - Koizumi IC

See also
 List of Railway Stations in Japan

References

External links

  

Railway stations in Gifu Prefecture
Taita Line
Railway stations in Japan opened in 1918
Stations of Central Japan Railway Company
Tajimi, Gifu